The 2003–04 Czech Extraliga season was the 11th season of the Czech Extraliga since its creation after the breakup of Czechoslovakia and the Czechoslovak First Ice Hockey League in 1993.

Standings

Playoffs

Quarterfinal
 HC Moeller Pardubice - HC Lasselsberger Plzeň 6:3 (1:2,2:0,3:1)
 HC Moeller Pardubice - HC Lasselsberger Plzeň 5:2 (1:0,2:2,2:0)
 HC Lasselsberger Plzeň - HC Moeller Pardubice 4:2 (2:1,1:1,1:0)
 HC Lasselsberger Plzeň - HC Moeller Pardubice 6:3 (1:1,2:2,3:0)
 HC Moeller Pardubice - HC Lasselsberger Plzeň 5:2 (1:0,3:1,1:1)
 HC Lasselsberger Plzeň - HC Moeller Pardubice 3:1 (0:0,1:1,2:0)
 HC Moeller Pardubice - HC Lasselsberger Plzeň 1:5 (0:2,1:2,0:1)
 HC Hamé Zlín - HC Oceláři Třinec 4:1 (3:0,0:0,1:1)
 HC Hamé Zlín - HC Oceláři Třinec 1:3 (1:2,0:1,0:0)
 HC Oceláři Třinec - HC Hamé Zlín 1:0 (0:0,1:0,0:0)
 HC Oceláři Třinec - HC Hamé Zlín 2:3 SN (1:0,1:1,0:1,0:0)
 HC Hamé Zlín - HC Oceláři Třinec 8:3 (2:0,1:2,5:1)
 HC Oceláři Třinec - HC Hamé Zlín 1:0 SN (0:0,0:0,0:0,0:0)
 HC Hamé Zlín - HC Oceláři Třinec 2:0 (0:0,1:0,1:0)
 HC Excalibur Znojemští Orli - HC Slavia Praha 4:3 (0:0,1:1,3:2)
 HC Excalibur Znojemští Orli - HC Slavia Praha 1:4 (0:1,1:0,0:3)
 HC Slavia Praha - HC Excalibur Znojemští Orli 2:3 PP (1:0,1:2,0:0,0:1)
 HC Slavia Praha - HC Excalibur Znojemští Orli 3:0 (1:0,1:0,1:0)
 HC Excalibur Znojemští Orli - HC Slavia Praha 5:2 (1:1,1:0,3:1)
 HC Slavia Praha - HC Excalibur Znojemští Orli 5:0 (2:0,2:0,1:0)
 HC Excalibur Znojemští Orli - HC Slavia Praha 2:3 SN (2:1,0:1,0:0,0:0)
 HC Sparta Praha - HC Vítkovice 3:2 PP (0:0,1:1,1:1,1:0)
 HC Sparta Praha - HC Vítkovice 3:0 (0:0,2:0,1:0)
 HC Vítkovice - HC Sparta Praha 5:0 (1:0,3:0,1:0)
 HC Vítkovice - HC Sparta Praha 6:2 (1:0,3:0,2:2)
 HC Sparta Praha - HC Vítkovice 6:1 (1:0,0:0,5:1)
 HC Vítkovice - HC Sparta Praha 1:4 (1:1,0:1,0:2)

Semifinal
 HC Hamé Zlín - HC Lasselsberger Plzeň 7:2 (2:1,3:1,2:0)
 HC Hamé Zlín - HC Lasselsberger Plzeň 4:3 PP (2:1,0:1,1:1,1:0)
 HC Lasselsberger Plzeň - HC Hamé Zlín 3:2 (1:1,2:1,0:0)
 HC Lasselsberger Plzeň - HC Hamé Zlín 0:3 (0:1,0:0,0:2)
 HC Hamé Zlín - HC Lasselsberger Plzeň 4:2 (1:0,1:1,2:1)
 HC Sparta Praha - HC Slavia Praha 1:4 (1:1,0:0,0:3)
 HC Sparta Praha - HC Slavia Praha 2:1 PP (0:1,0:0,1:0,1:0)
 HC Slavia Praha - HC Sparta Praha 1:2 SN (0:1,1:0,0:0,0:0)
 HC Slavia Praha - HC Sparta Praha 3:4 SN (3:1,0:0,0:2,0:0)
 HC Sparta Praha - HC Slavia Praha 3:4 PP (0:1,1:0,2:2,0:1)
 HC Slavia Praha - HC Sparta Praha 4:2 (0:0,1:2,3:0)
 HC Sparta Praha - HC Slavia Praha 0:3 (0:1,0:0,0:2)

Final
HC Hamé Zlín - HC Slavia Praha 2–3, 3–2, 2–1, 1–0, 4-1

HC Hamé Zlín wins the Czech Extraliga.

Relegation

 HC České Budějovice - HC Dukla Jihlava 2:3 PP (0:0,2:1,0:1,0:1)
 HC České Budějovice - HC Dukla Jihlava 0:1 (0:0,0:0,0:1)
 HC Dukla Jihlava - HC České Budějovice 3:2 SN (1:1,1:0,0:1,0:0)
 HC Dukla Jihlava - HC České Budějovice 3:0 (0:0,1:0,2:0)

References

External links 
 

Czech Extraliga seasons
1
Czech